Poland participated in the Eurovision Song Contest 2003 with the song "Keine Grenzen – Żadnych granic" written by André Franke, Joachim Horn-Bernges, Michał Wiśniewski and Jacek Łągwa. The song was performed by the band Ich Troje. The Polish broadcaster Telewizja Polska (TVP) returned to the Eurovision Song Contest after a one-year absence following their withdrawal in 2002 as one of the bottom six countries in the 2001 contest. TVP organised the national final Krajowe Eliminacje do Konkursu Piosenki Eurowizji 2003 in order to select the Polish entry for the 2003 contest in Riga, Latvia. The national final took place on 25 January 2003 and featured fourteen entries. "Keine Grenzen – Żadnych granic" performed by Ich Troje was selected as the winner after gaining 31.8% of the public vote.

Poland competed in the Eurovision Song Contest which took place on 24 May 2003. Performing during the show in position 20, Poland placed seventh out of the 26 participating countries, scoring 90 points.

Background 
Prior to the 2003 Contest, Poland had participated in the Eurovision Song Contest seven times since its first entry in 1994. Poland's highest placement in the contest, to this point, has been second place, which the nation achieved with its debut entry in 1994 with the song "To nie ja!" performed by Edyta Górniak.

The Polish national broadcaster, Telewizja Polska (TVP), broadcasts the event within Poland and organises the selection process for the nation's entry. TVP confirmed Poland's participation in the 2003 Eurovision Song Contest on 19 September 2002. Since 1994, the broadcaster opted to internally select their entries. However, along with their participation confirmation, TVP announced that the Polish entry for the 2003 Eurovision Song Contest would be selected via a national final for the first time.

Before Eurovision

Krajowe Eliminacje do Konkursu Piosenki Eurowizji 2003 
Krajowe Eliminacje do Konkursu Piosenki Eurowizji 2003 was the national final organised by TVP in order to select the Polish entry for the Eurovision Song Contest 2003. The show took place on 25 January 2003 at the Studio 5 of TVP in Warsaw, hosted by Artur Orzech. Public televoting exclusively selected the winner. The show was broadcast on TVP1 and TVP Polonia as well as via radio on Radio Eska. The national final was watched by 7.27 million viewers in Poland with a market share of 46%.

Competing entries 
TVP opened a submission period for interested artists and songwriters to submit their entries between 19 September 2002 and 15 November 2002. The broadcaster received 43 submissions at the closing of the deadline. A six-member selection committee selected fifteen entries from the received submissions to compete in the national final. The selection committee consisted of Janusz Kosiński (journalist), Zygmunt Kukla (conductor, composer), Leszek Kumański (TV director, screenwriter and producer), Marek Sierocki (Head of Entertainment of TVP1 and artistic directors of the Opole Festival and Sopot Festival), Hirek Wrona (journalist) and Piotr Klatt (musician, songwriter, journalist and music producer at TVP). The selected entries were announced on 30 November 2002. On 11 December 2002, "Pierwszy raz", written by Piotr Rubik and Jolanta Literska and to have been performed by Georgina Tarasiuk, was disqualified from the national final due to the singer not being aged at least 16 on the day of the Eurovision Song Contest 2003.

Final 
The televised final took place on 25 January 2003. Fourteen entries competed and the winner, "Keine Grenzen – Żadnych granic" performed by Ich Troje, was determined entirely by a public vote. In addition to the performances of the competing entries, 1994 Polish Eurovision entrant Edyta Górniak opened the show with her new single "Impossible", while the band Bajm performed as the interval act.

Controversy 
Following the Polish national final, it was revealed that approximately 300,000 votes were submitted by the public with less than 25% being successfully transmitted and registered during the 15-minute voting window, due to the system operated by the telecom provider being overwhelmed by the high influx of votes. Following media and public inquiries, TVP published the voting percentage of the top three entries with the addition of the delayed votes on 27 January, which revealed that the results remain unchanged despite the margin between the top two entries being shortened. Unconfirmed reports also suggested that Varius Manx, Bracia Cugowscy and Ha-Dwa-O had placed fourth to sixth, respectively.

At Eurovision 
According to Eurovision rules, all nations with the exceptions of the bottom ten countries in the 2002 contest competed in the final on 24 May 2003. On 29 November 2002, a special allocation draw was held which determined the running order and Poland was set to perform in position 20, following the entry from France and before the entry from Latvia. Poland finished in seventh place with 70 points.

The show was broadcast in Poland on TVP1 and TVP Polonia with commentary by Artur Orzech. The Polish spokesperson, who announced the Polish votes during the final, was Maciej Orłoś.

Voting 
Below is a breakdown of points awarded to Poland and awarded by Poland in the contest. The nation awarded its 12 points to Belgium in the contest.

References 

2003
Countries in the Eurovision Song Contest 2003
Eurovision
Eurovision